Nkwanta South is one of the constituencies represented in the Parliament of Ghana. It elects one Member of Parliament (MP) by the first past the post system of election. Nkwanta South is located in the Nkwanta South district  of the Oti Region of Ghana.

Boundaries
The seat is located within the Nkwanta District of the Volta Region of Ghana. It was formed prior to the 2004 December presidential and parliamentary elections by the division of the old Nkwanta constituency into the new Nkwanta South and Nkwanta South constituencies.

Members of Parliament

Elections

See also
List of Ghana Parliament constituencies

References 

Adam Carr's Election Archives 
Ghana Home Page

Parliamentary constituencies in the Oti Region